Erminio Valenti (1564 – 22 August 1618) was a Roman Catholic cardinal.

Biography
On 18 Sep 1605, he was consecrated bishop by Pietro Aldobrandini, Archbishop of Ravenna, with Ludovico de Torres, Archbishop of Monreale, and Laudivio Zacchia, Bishop of Corneto e Montefiascone, serving as co-consecrators. He also served 1604-1618 as bishop of Faenza.

References

External links and additional sources
 (for Chronology of Bishops) 
 (for Chronology of Bishops)  

1564 births
1618 deaths
17th-century Italian cardinals